The St Joseph's College, Ipswich National Schoolboy Rugby Festival is a schools rugby union competition in the UK.

The Festival was started in 1987 to commemorate the Golden Jubilee of the College. Schools invited to take part come from both the state and independent sectors. The Festival has a record of featuring future England players, including former captain Chris Robshaw, British and Irish Lion Mako Vunipola, Charlie Sharples, Mike Tindall, Jonathan Joseph, Zach Mercer and most recently Marcus Smith, who won player of the tournament for Brighton College in 2016.

16 British teams, including hosts St Joseph's, compete in a 2 day competition. On day 1, 4 groups of 4, drawn randomly, play each other. On day 2, the top 2 from each group enter the De La Salle Cup and the bottom 2 enter the plate competition.

Past De La Salle winners include John Fisher School, Millfield, Brighton College and St Joseph's College.

Player(s) of the Tournament

References

Rugby union cup competitions in England